Martin Qiuigley may refer to:'

Martin Quigley (hurler) (born 1951), Irish sportsman and professional hurler
Martin Quigley (publisher) (1890–1964), publisher and journalist in the film industry; proponent and co-author of the Motion Picture Production Code
Martin Quigley Jr. (1917–2011), publisher of film magazines, author and politician
Martin Quigley, director of Arboretum of the University of Central Florida
Martin P. Quigley, Irish member of Dundalk IRA member, allegedly part of the South Armagh Snipers in the 1990s